The Firmin Sword of Peace (previously known as the Wilkinson Sword of Peace) is an award given to units of the British Armed Forces for activities above and beyond the unit's normal role that improve relations with the community, either within the United Kingdom, or overseas.

The award was established by British swordmaker Wilkinson Sword in 1966, with the company presenting a ceremonial sword to one unit each of the Royal Navy (including the Royal Fleet Auxiliary), British Army, and Royal Air Force; each unit having been judged as making the most outstanding contribution to community relations within each service during the calendar year.

The award can also be shared with foreign military units: the frigates  and  received the 1983 Navy Sword of Peace after a series of port visits made by the two ships to African nations sparked several diplomatic initiatives. From 1994 onwards, the company began presenting a fourth sword to any joint-service unit or ad hoc single-operation unit that met the criteria for the award. Unlike the awards for the three services, the "Special" sword was only presented if such a unit existed and was deemed worth recognising.

After Wilkinson stopped the production of swords in 2005, Firmin & Sons began sponsoring the award. Awards since 2005 have been made as follows:

Additionally in 2014 a Special Achievement Award was made to the Gurkha Welfare Scheme.

References

Ceremonial weapons
Honorary weapons
Military awards and decorations of the United Kingdom